The RES Group (Renewable Energy Systems) is a global renewable energy company which has been active in the renewable energy industry for over 30 years. Its core business is to develop, construct and operate large-scale, grid-connected renewable energy projects worldwide for commercial, industrial and utility clients. RES is active in the wind (onshore and offshore wind)  and solar energy sectors and is increasingly focused on the transition to a low-carbon economy providing transmission, energy storage and demand side management expertise.

History

Renewable Energy Systems was started in 1982 as part of the Sir Robert McAlpine group of engineering and construction companies. Its early years were spent in researching various designs for commercial wind turbines, including work on a vertical axis wind turbine (VAWT) model as well as the now more widely used horizontal axis (HAWT) units. The company built its first commercial wind farm at Carland Cross in Cornwall in 1992, using 15 Vestas turbines, each of 400 kW capacity.  In December 1998, the first commercial 1MW wind turbine to be designed and built in the UK was installed by RES at Slievenahanaghan, Co Antrim.  

In 2001 the company built the then-largest wind farm in the world at King Mountain in Texas, using 214 Bonus turbines of 1.3 MW capacity. In 2005, RES won a Queen's Award for Enterprise in the Sustainable Development category. More recently the company has been active in the developing offshore UK wind power market. It has supported the delivery of both onshore and offshore engineering works for the Lynn and Inner Dowsing offshore wind farms off the coast of Lincolnshire in the UK.

The RES Group has now developed and/or constructed over 100 wind farms worldwide, with more than 12 GW of capacity. In addition, it has projects on its books totaling several thousand megawatts worldwide, at various stages of development.

The group manages the assets of The Renewables Infrastructure Group, a company involved in onshore wind and solar energy in Britain, France and Ireland, that floated on the London Stock Exchange in 2013 to raise up to GBP 300 million.

The RES Group has offices across the UK, Europe, North America, and Australia.

UK Headquarters Building

Since late 2003 RES has been based at its low carbon headquarters building at Beaufort Court, Kings Langley, Hertfordshire in the UK. This unique site, centered on the old 'Arts and Crafts' style Ovaltine Egg Farm building originally constructed in 1929, uses electricity supplied from its own 225 kW Vestas V29 wind turbine and from on-site photovoltaic panels. Heat comes from 170 m2 of solar thermal panels and from a biomass boiler. A miscanthus energy crop is grown on 5 hectares of the site, whilst cooling is produced on demand using pumped ground water.

See also 

 Solar power in the United Kingdom
 Wind power in the United Kingdom
 Blyth Biomass Power Station

References

The following sites give further information on the Beaufort Court location.

External links

Companies based in Three Rivers District
Engineering companies of the United Kingdom
Renewable energy in the United Kingdom
Wind power companies of the United Kingdom